DeCost Smith, also written De Cost Smith, (1864–1939) was a painter, illustrator and writer in the United States who depicted scenes of native peoples and chronicled some of their activities. His collection of artifacts became part of the American Museum of Natural History and Smithsonian collections. Cornell University has a collection of his papers and other materials.

Smith was born in Skaneateles in Western New York state in 1864 to E. Reuel Smith (E.R) and Elizabeth DeCost. His father inherited the Reuel E. Smith House. The home was not far from the Onondaga tribe reservation.

DeCost traveled west with his brother Leslie Smith in 1884. He studied in Paris in 1885. He also later exhibited his work "Conflicting Faiths there in 1889. It is now exhibited at the Skaneateles Library.

He worked with fellow artists Edwin Deming and Frederic Remington. Smith collected artifacts from the Sioux, Crow, and Onondaga Indians. He also wrote about the tribes and the encroachment they were experiencing. He served with the Bureau of Indian Affairs under various administrations including Theodore Roosevelt's. He met Sitting Bull, Tendoi, Rain-in-the-Face and other tribal leaders. Smith wrote two books about his expeditions and experiences.

Smith died in Amenia, New York in 1939. He is buried there with his wife Elizabeth Mills Smith, who died in 1930. They never had children.

Bibliography
Red Indian Experiences by DeCost Smith, Caxton Printers 1943
Martyrs of the Oblong and the Little NineMartyrs, about the tribe of Mohawks in the New York area and their decline

References

1864 births
1939 deaths
Painters from New York (state)
American illustrators
People from Skaneateles, New York